Mauritius is a play by Theresa Rebeck. It opened on Broadway in 2007.

Production
Mauritius premiered on Broadway at the Biltmore Theatre on October 4, 2007, and closed November 25, 2007. This play marked the Broadway debut for Rebeck. The play was directed by Doug Hughes with scenic design by John Lee Beatty, costume design by Catherine Zuber and lighting design by Paul Gallo in a Manhattan Theatre Club production.  Bobby Cannavale received a Tony Award nomination for Best Performance by a Featured Actor in a Play.

The play had its world premiere in Boston by the Huntington Theatre Company at the Boston Center for the Arts Calderwood Pavilion in October 2006.  The play was directed by Rebecca Taichman and starred Marin Ireland as Jackie, Michael Aronov as Dennis, Robert Dorfman, Laura Latreille and James Gale as Sterling.

It was presented at Chicago's Northlight Theatre from February 25 to April 5, 2009. 

The play was produced by the Pasadena Playhouse, California opening on April 9, 2009. Direction was by
Jessica Kubzansky.

Overview
The play focuses on two half-sisters, Jackie and Mary, who inherit a stamp collection which might be worth a fortune.  The title refers to the "Blue Mauritius", one of the world's rarest stamps. The sisters become involved with three men, including the owner of a stamp store Phillip and Dennis, whose occupation is somewhat mysterious. The characters try to out-do each other in attempting to reap possible rewards from the stamp collection.

Opening night Broadway cast
F. Murray Abraham – Sterling
Dylan Baker – Phillip
Bobby Cannavale – Dennis
Katie Finneran – Mary
Alison Pill – Jackie

References

External links
Internet Broadway Database
 Review of a 2006 production in Boston

2006 plays
Plays by Theresa Rebeck
Broadway plays
Philately